Alexey Smirnov (born October 9, 1977) is a male table tennis player from Russia. Since 2003 he won several medals in doubles events in the Table Tennis European Championships. He also won the gold medal at the Europe Top-12 in 2005 at Rennes.

He is also a multiple Russian national champion – four times in Men Singles and five in Men Doubles.  He was also part of the winning cadet European Youth Championship team in 1992, as well as being the winner of the men's singles, the men's doubles and the mixed doubles at the junior level at the 1995 European Youth Championships.  He also won the junior men's doubles at the 1994 European Youth Championships.

In May 2011 he qualified for the London 2012 Olympic Games via his world ranking for June 2011.  He reached the last 32 where he was beaten by Jiang Tianyi.  The Russian men's team lost to the eventual winners, China, in the first round.

Career records
Singles (as of 4 October 2014)
 Olympics: round of 32 (2008, 2012).
 World Championships: round of 32 (2005, 2011, 2013)
 World Cup appearances: 4. Record: 5–8th (2003).
 Pro Tour Semi-Final: German Open 2002, Brazilian Open 2003, Croatian Open 2007
 Pro Tour Grand Finals appearances: 3. Record: round of 16 (2002, 2003, 2010).
 European Championships: QF (2003, 2005)
 Europe Top-12: Winner (2005).

Men's doubles
 Olympics – 4th (2004)
 World Championships: round of 16 (2003, 2005, 2007)
 Pro Tour winner (1): Slovenian Open 2010.
 European Championships: Runner-up (2003)

Mixed doubles
 World Championships: round of 64 (1999, 2003, 2005, 2007).
 European Championships: QF (2005, 2007)F (2007).

Team
 Olympics: 9th (2012).
 World Championships: 6th (2006, 2010).
 World Team Cup: 7th (2007)
 World Cup: 5th (2011)

See also
 List of table tennis players

References

External links
 
 
 
 
 

Russian male table tennis players
Living people
Olympic table tennis players of Russia
Table tennis players at the 2004 Summer Olympics
Table tennis players at the 2008 Summer Olympics
Table tennis players at the 2012 Summer Olympics
1977 births
Sportspeople from Tolyatti